Leißling (or Leissling) is a village and a former municipality in the Burgenlandkreis district, in Saxony-Anhalt, Germany. Since 1 September 2010, it is part of the town Weißenfels.

Location 
Leißling lies south-west of Weißenfels on the Saale.

History 
The first documented mention of Leißling was made in the year 1232. On 1 September 2010 the village was annexed by Weißenfels.

Monuments 
 Stone on Market Street in memory of the communist working athlete Otto Müller, who was sentenced to jail and died in 999th Light Afrika Division (Germany).
 Plaque on the house in Karl Marx Square where the communist functionary Fritz Schellbach, who died young in a Nazi Concentration Camp in 1944, was born.

Coat of arms
Coat of arms was approved in 1995 by the local government office in Halle.

Twinning 
The town is twinned with Carlsberg in Rheinland-Pfalz.

Sights 

The Marion Church is a baroque church with pictures. It was consecrated in 1716.

Economy and Infrastructure

Economy 
Leißling is well known for its mineral springs, which a company called Mitteldeutsche Erfrischungsgetränke GmbH & Co. KG uses for Leißlinger Mineral water. The largest shopping center in a 10-mile radius is found in Leißling.

Transportation 
The National Road B87 passes near Leißling. Leißling is a station on the Thüringer Bahn from Erfurt to Halle.

Sport 
Th football club Fortuna Leißling was founded around 1930. Games are played on the "monastery meadow". In the past there were also more clubs: cycling, bowling and gymnastics.

References

External links 
 Website der ehemaligen Gemeinde Leißling

Former municipalities in Saxony-Anhalt
Weißenfels